Tapuae Marine Reserve is a marine reserve created in 2008 off the Taranaki coast of New Zealand.

It protects an area of 1404 ha and adjoins the Sugar Loaf Islands Marine Protected Area.

References

External links
Tapuae Marine Reserve at the Department of Conservation

Marine reserves of New Zealand
New Plymouth District
Protected areas established in 2008
Protected areas of Taranaki
2008 establishments in New Zealand
Black sand beaches